Rifle Creek is a stream in Garfield County in the U.S. state of Colorado. Rifle Creek is a tributary to the Colorado River.

Rifle Creek starts at the confluence of West Rifle Creek and East Rifle Creek and the junction is within the waters of the Rifle Gap Reservoir. The stream flows south and enters the Colorado after passing through the city of Rifle.

Rifle Creek was named from an incident in which a rifle was found along its banks.

See also
List of rivers of Colorado

References

Rivers of Garfield County, Colorado
Rivers of Colorado